Andrew Lane is the name of:

 Andy Lane (born 1963), British author and journalist
 Andrew Lane (actor) (1947–1999), from The Leisure Hive

 Andrew Lane (record producer), American songwriter and record producer
 Andrew Lane (film producer) (born 1951), American film producer
 Andrew R. Lane (born 1960), oil and natural gas executive